Humboldt Public Library in Humboldt, Iowa, USA, is a free public library. The library received a $10,000 grant from the Carnegie Corporation of New York on December 13, 1906.  The Des Moines architectural firm of Hallett & Rawson designed the building. It was built using limestone from a nearby area now known as Taft Park. Construction began in 1908 and it was dedicated on February 9, 1909. The rough texture of the rock-faced stone and the portico columns in the Tuscan order give the building a rustic appearance. It was listed on the National Register of Historic Places in 1983. A north entrance and extension were added to the building in 1992.

References

Library buildings completed in 1909
Public libraries in Iowa
Carnegie libraries in Iowa
Libraries on the National Register of Historic Places in Iowa
Buildings and structures in Humboldt County, Iowa
Education in Humboldt County, Iowa
Humboldt, Iowa
National Register of Historic Places in Humboldt County, Iowa